Wilkommen Folk Tell Drekka Fest! is the debut full-length album by Norwegian folk metal band, Trollfest.  It was released on March 15, 2005 by Solistitium Records.  The album name translates roughly to "Welcome Folk to the Drinking Feast" in English.

Track listing
"Trollfest" - 1:31
"Willkommen Folk tell Drekka Fest" - 3:21
"Helvetes Hunden GARM" - 3:44
"En ytterst Heftig Sak" - 2:48
"Sagaen om Suttungs-Mjöd" - 3:38
"Der Erste Krieg" - 4:15
"DU kom for seint..." - 3:20
"TrollKamp" - 1:38
"Die Urgammal GeBräu" - 3:35
"Offer-Visa" - 2:26
"Der Tag Nach-hinter" - 2:27
"...Nå må DU Drikka mest!!" - 3:48

Trollfest albums
2005 debut albums